Extramarks Education is an education technology company, that provides online and offline schooling and curricula. It was founded in 2007 by Atul Kulshrestha, and headquartered in Noida, India.

As of March 2022, Extramarks has tied up with 10,000 government and private schools. It has over 10 million students and over 2.2 million online users. The company has trained more than 1 million teachers in the effective use of learning pedagogies, digital tools and essential technical skills in the classroom.

Extramarks operates in India, Singapore, Indonesia, Ghana, South Africa, United States and the Middle East. Mukesh Ambani bought a 38.5% stake in Extramarks in 2011. It was listed among Global50 Education Companies 2018 by Tyton Global Growth50.

History 
Extramarks was founded in 2007 by Atul Kulshrestha.

In November 2011, its 38.5% stake was acquired by Mukesh Ambani owned Infotel Broadband and the investment was done through an affiliate company Reliance Strategic Investments for an undisclosed amount.

In May 2017, the company launched the test preparation and coaching centres for entrance examinations like Joint Entrance Examination (Mains and Advanced), Medical and foundation (Classes VI-X) and has classroom coaching centers in Jaipur, Bhopal, Indore, Lucknow, and Haldwani.

In January 2022, a brand new campaign called 'School se Ghar Tak '  was launched by the company to put emphasis on the need of personalized and interactive digital learning environment.

In April 2022, the company re-designed its logo and changed the visual appearance.

Products 
In September 2015, Extramarks launched an Android app called Extramarks Smart Study, which allows students to study for Central Board of Secondary Education (CBSE) and ICSE curricula, ranging from pre-primary (kindergarten) and Class 1 to Class 12.

In August 2017, it developed an app called Total Learning, which allows students to access the curriculum-mapped learning solutions at home and lets teachers and parents track and monitor the student's performance.

In November 2018, Extramarks launched IITJEE Test Prep App, which allows students to take mock online tests for IITJEE preparation. It also has an app called Interactive Learning App, launched in February 2019. In March 2019, it launched Extramarks Achieve, a mentorship program to provide one-to-one guidance and support to students.

In October 2019, it created and launched an Artificial Intelligence-based chatbot called 'Alex' to help students clear their doubts. Extramarks launched kids learning app called Lil One in November 2020.

It has an app called The Learning App, which contains solutions for various subjects, including classes of both CBSE and ICSE Boards examinations along with JEE and NEET courses.

In March 2022, the company launched "The Teaching App" for school institutes and teachers, private teachers, coaching staff and home tutors to set up online classes coupled with a robust assessment platform, extensive content repository, live class platform and digital classroom management tools.

Partnership 
In October 2016, Extramarks partnered with New Delhi Municipal Council to deploy a smart education system in NDMC schools.

In October 2017, Extramarks Education was tied up with Bharat Sanchar Nigam Limited (BSNL) to provide digital learning solutions to BSNL users.

In January 2018, the company partnered with Power Grid Corporation of India to offer digital solutions at Indian Army-run schools in Jammu and Kashmir. On 25 May 2018, the digital solutions learning programme, facilitated by Extramarks was inaugurated by General Bipin Rawat, the Chief of the Army Staff (India) at Army Goodwill School, Pahalgam. The company is also in partnership with Samsung, Intel Education, Advan, New Delhi Municipal Council, Muslim Educational Trust, DRB-HICOM and Takalkar Edhub.

In February 2020, the company was partnered with Indraprastha Institute of Information Technology, Delhi (IIIT-Delhi) to promote and encourage research in Artificial Intelligence. It tied up with Mahindra Lifespaces in October 2020.

In February 2022, the company announced its multi-year deal with Arsenal Football Club to become its official learning partner in India, South Africa and the Middle East.

Recognition

References

External links 
 Official website
 Extramarks Education: Bestowing a Total Learning Approach on Silicon India Magazine
 Extramarks eyes education sector with new age digital solutions on Tribune India

Test preparation companies
Education companies established in 2009
Education companies of India
2009 establishments in Uttar Pradesh
Educational technology companies of India
Indian companies established in 2009